World Tour Soccer: Challenge Edition, known as simply World Tour Soccer in North America, is a sports video game developed by London Studio and published by Sony Computer Entertainment exclusively for PlayStation Portable as a launch title for the system.

Reception

World Tour Soccer: Challenge Edition received "mixed or average" reviews, according to review aggregator Metacritic.

References

External links

2005 video games
Association football video games
Multiplayer and single-player video games
PlayStation Portable games
PlayStation Portable-only games
Sony Interactive Entertainment games
This Is Football
Video games developed in the United Kingdom
London Studio games